Catbird Records is an independent record label formed in September 2005 in Columbus, Ohio. It is based in New York City. It was founded and is run by Ryan Catbird of music blog The Catbirdseat. The label is financed solely by advertising revenue generated by the Catbirdseat music blog.

Discography
 CBR001 Someone Still Loves You Boris Yeltsin/Michael Holt - Someone Still Loves You Michael Holt: A Scrapbook For You
 CBR002 Pet Politics - In My Head
 CBR003 Hemstad - Hemstad
 CBR004 Get Him Eat Him - Do As I Tell You
 CBR005 Tap Tap - Lanzafame
 CBR006 Maestro Echoplex - Last Night I Saw God On The Dancefloor
 CBR007 Pet Politics - The Spring
 CBR008 Mathew Sawyer & The Ghosts - Blue Birds Blood
 CSP001 Fulton Lights - Fulton Lights (Limited Edition Version)
 CBR009 Forest Fire - Psychic Love Star
 CBR010 Moviola - Dead Knowledge
 CB7001 Get Him Eat Him - There's A Guy 7"
 CSP002 The Underpainting - The Underpainting (Limited Edition Version)
 CSP003 Jason Zumpano - In The Co. Of Ghosts: Music For Jason McLean
 CSP004 Prairie Cat - Attacks!
 CBR011 Clear Tigers - EP
 CBR012 Manishevitz - East To East
 CBR013 PWRFL Power - EP
 CBR014 Air Waves - EP
 CBR015 Forest Fire - Survival
 CSP005 Fulton Lights - The Way We Ride
 CSP006 Jason Zumpano - Roses $9.99 Dozen
 CBR016 George Washington Brown - EP
 CBR017 Apollo Ghosts - Forgotten Triangle
 CSP007 Apollo Ghosts - Hastings Sunrise

Co-Releases
In Catbird catalog numbering, 'CSP' ("Catbird Special Projects) denotes a special release of some kind, or a co-release with another label, typically wherein Catbird provides a limited special-edition version of an album with a larger-scale release.  Co-releases:

 CSP001 Split release with Android Eats Records  
 CSP002 Split release with Tower Of Song Records
 CSP004 Split release with Fuzzy Logic Recordings

Bonus items
Catbird Records offers limited bonus materials with many releases, including bonus discs, special packaging variations and the like:

 CBR001 Unique hand-painted covers
 CBR002 Various cover colors
 CBR003 First 200 copies included 5-song bonus disc, in unique sleeves handcrafted by Hemstad
 CBR004 Various cover colors, various insert variations
 CBR005 First 200 copies in hand-bound, cloth-covered book, with 3-song bonus disc
 CBR006 First 100 copies included 4-song bonus disc, Songs About Planes
 CBR007 Various cover colors, various insert stamps
 CBR008 First 200 copies included 3-song bonus disc
 CBR009 Various cover colors
 CBR010 200 copies included bonus DVD with videos, photos, and demos
 CSP003 3 prints of art by Jason McLean included, in varying colors
 CSP004 Unique hand-painted covers
 CBR012 First 100 copies included 4-song bonus disc, in hand-decorated sleeves
 CBR013 Various cover colors
 CBR015 Available in 'Giant Size' (12" x 12") edition
 CSP005 Variant white cover
 CSP006 Unique hand-colored covers
 CBR017 25 copies with variant photo/acetate cover

T-Shirts
Catbird Records has done several limited-edition T-shirt pressings.

 Logo Tee (Summer 2006) - Edition of 50.  Colors: red, blue, green, brown, grey, black
 Tap Tap Elephant Tee - Edition of 50.  Colors: navy
 Hemstad Tee - Edition of 15.  Colors: pink
 Logo Tee (Fall 2006) - Edition of 50.  Colors: brown
 Logo Tee (Summer 2007) - Edition of 50.  Colors: green, purple, aqua, slate, black

See also
 List of record labels

External links
 Catbird Records
 The Catbirdseat
 Catbird Records on Myspace
 Catbird Records on Virb
 Stylus Magazine Label Profile
 Behance Magazine Feature on Catbird Records
 BiBaBiDi Interview with Hemstad Part 1 of 2
 BiBaBiDi Interview with Hemstad Part 2 of 2

American independent record labels
Indie rock record labels
Alternative rock record labels